Aziz Ezzat Pasha (24 June 1869 – 12 April 1961) was an Egyptian politician.

Foreign Ministry
Born in Cairo and of Albanian origin, Aziz Ezzat Pasha was educated at Jesus College, Cambridge and the now defunct Royal Military Academy, Woolwich. He began his career in the court of Khedive Isma'il Pasha and was then promoted to deputy minister of foreign affairs. Following the United Kingdom's unilateral grant of independence to Egypt in 1922, he was appointed as Egypt's first minister plenipotentiary to the Court of St. James's, serving for five years, from 1923 until 1928. He served as Egypt's Foreign Minister from 18 February 1935 until 30 January 1936.

Regency
Aziz Ezzat Pasha was a member of the Regency Council during King Farouk I's minority. He served as regent from 28 April 1936 until 29 July 1937, alongside Prince Muhammad Ali Tewfik and Sherif Sabri Pasha. As such, he was allocated , a huge sum at that time.

Al-Ahly
Aziz Ezzat Pasha was greatly involved with the famous Egyptian sports club Al Ahly. On 2 April 1908, he became the club's second president. He was the first Egyptian to hold that post, and kept it until 16 April 1914. He later became Honorary President of the club (1929-1941).

Family
Aziz Ezzat Pasha's second wife, Behiye Yeghen Hanim, whom he married in 1892, was a granddaughter of Khedive Isma'il Pasha from her mother's side. Their daughter Aysha Hanim (1893 - 1945) married in 1912 (and later divorced in 1927) Prince Muhammad Ali Hassan Pasha, another grandson of Khedive Isma'il.

References
General

Specific

1869 births
1961 deaths
20th-century Regents of Egypt
Egyptian people of Albanian descent
Foreign ministers of Egypt
Ambassadors of Egypt to the United Kingdom
Egyptian pashas
19th-century Egyptian people
Honorary Knights Grand Cross of the Royal Victorian Order
Alumni of Jesus College, Cambridge
Graduates of the Royal Military Academy, Woolwich
Sports executives and administrators
Politicians from Cairo
Place of death missing